The Men's 1999 World Amateur Boxing Championships were held in Houston, United States from August 15 to August 29. The tenth edition of this competition, a year before the Summer Olympics in Sydney, Australia, was organised by the world governing body for amateur boxing AIBA.

Medal winners

Medal table

External links 
Results on Amateur Boxing

World Amateur Boxing Championships
AIBA World Boxing Championships
World Amateur Boxing Championships
World Amateur Boxing Championships
World Amateur Boxing
Sports competitions in Houston
August 1999 sports events in the United States
1999 in Houston
Boxing in Houston
International sports competitions in Texas